The 2014–15 Richmond Spiders men's basketball team represented the University of Richmond during the 2014–15 NCAA Division I men's basketball season. Richmond competed as a member of the Atlantic 10 Conference (A-10) under tenth-year head coach Chris Mooney and played its home games at the Robins Center. They finished the season 21–14, 12–6 in A-10 play to finish in a tie for fourth place. They lost in the quarterfinals of the A-10 tournament to VCU. They were invited to the National Invitation Tournament where they defeated St. Francis Brooklyn in the first round and Arizona State in the second round to advance to the quarterfinals where they lost to Miami (FL).

Previous season
The Spiders finished the season with an overall record of 19–14, with a record of 8–8 in the Atlantic 10 regular season to finish in seventh place. In the 2014 Atlantic 10 tournament the Spiders were defeated by VCU in the quarterfinals. Despite having 19 wins, they did not participate in a post season tournament.

Off season

Departures

Recruiting

Roster

Schedule

|-
!colspan=9 style="background:#000066; color:#FFFFFF;"| Non-conference regular season

|-
!colspan=9 style="background:#000066; color:#FFFFFF;"| Atlantic 10 regular season

|-
!colspan=9 style="background:#000066; color:#FFFFFF;"| Atlantic 10 tournament

|-
!colspan=9 style="background:#000066; color:#FFFFFF;"| National Invitation tournament

Source:

References

Richmond Spiders men's basketball seasons
Richmond
Richmond Spiders men's basketball
Richmond
Richmond